The FIS Ski Flying World Ski Championships 1985 was held between 16 and 17 March in Planica, Yugoslavia. This was the third record time hosting world championships after 1972 and 1979. 

The attendance at Planica was an all-time record, with a total of 150,000 people in three days: 20,000 people in training, 80,000 on the first day and 50,000 on the second day of the competition.

Schedule

All jumps over 190 metres 
Chronological order:
191 metres (627 ft) – 15 March – Matti Nykänen (WR, 2RD, Official training)
190 metres (623 ft) – 16 March – Matti Nykänen (1RD)

Competition 
On 13 March 1985 premiere hill test was on schedule. Yugoslavian ski jumper Branko Dolhar had honour to be the first. Distance of the day was set by Matjaž Debelak at 173 metres.

On 14 March 1985 second hill test or unofficial training was on schedule with ten Yugoslavian trial jumpers who made 20 jumps in total. Matjaž Debelak set the longest distance at 158 metres.

On 15 March 1985 official training in three rounds was on schedule with no qualifying. Three world records were set: Mike Holland in 1st round with 186 metres. Matti Nykänen broke the record short after with 187 in first and 191 metres in 2nd round.

On 16 March 1985 first day of championships with three rounds in competition on schedule in front of 80,000 people, a record Planica daily crowd and still one of the most visited ski jumping events ever. They saw Nykänen's 190 metres jump in the first round. 

On 17 March 1985 second and final day of world championships with only two rounds in competition, because the last round was canceled. Nykänen totally dominated with two world records and became world champion.

Hill test
Morning — 13 March 1985 — Two rounds — chronological order not available

Official training
Trial jumpers — 15 March 1985 — chronological order not available

11:00 AM — Competitors — 15 March 1985 — incomplete chronological order

Official results
3 of 5 best jumps counted. Two best from first day and the best one from second day. The last 6th round was canceled.

 World record! Didn't count into official results. The lowest scored jump of the day.

Ski flying world records

Medal table

References

External links
 FIS Ski flying World Championships 1985 results. - accessed 25 November 2009.

FIS Ski Flying World Championships
1985 in ski jumping
1985 in Slovenia
Ski jumping competitions in Yugoslavia
Ski jumping competitions in Slovenia
International sports competitions hosted by Slovenia
March 1985 sports events in Europe
1985 in Yugoslav sport